Oknha Truong Cang (also spelled Troueung Kang; 1913–1984) was a Cambodian politician and diplomat.

Truong Cang was a Khmer Krom. He served as Minister of Finance (1957-1958 and 1959) and foreign minister (1958) of Cambodia. He was also a member of the High Council of the Throne.

With his efforts, International Court of Justice (ICJ) awarded ownership of Preah Vihear Temple to Cambodia in 1962.

From 1964 to 1969 he was the ambassador to China. In 1967, the Chinese embassy in Cambodia published and distributed Communist propaganda to the Cambodian populace praising the Cultural Revolution, which irritated Norodom Sihanouk. Sihanouk threatened to break off diplomatic relations with China. Truong Cang was about to leave Beijing, but finally was persuaded to stay in China by Chinese premier Zhou Enlai.

From 1972 to 1973 he was the permanent representative to the United Nations.

Truong Cang was regarded as a national hero by Khmer nationalists. In Phnom Penh, Oknya Truong Cang Road was named after him.

References

1913 births
1984 deaths
Khmer Krom people
Cambodian politicians
Cambodian diplomats
Finance ministers of Cambodia
Foreign ministers of Cambodia
Ambassadors of Cambodia to China
Permanent Representatives of Cambodia to the United Nations